Digital Mandala is a psytrance album released in 2003 by Fractal Glider.

Track listing
 "Tabla Trek"
 "Megatonne"
 "Titanium Walls"
 "Striker"
 "Things That Go Bump In The Night"
 "My World"
 "6 Degrees"
 "Mezmorized (Remix)"
 "The Stem Cell"

2003 albums
Fractal Glider albums